Nathan Adam Sowter (born 12 October 1992) is an Australian-born English cricketer. He was born at Penrith, New South Wales.

A leg spinner, he made his debut for Middlesex in a T20 match in May 2015, taking 2 wickets for 2 runs in the four balls he delivered. He made his first-class debut for Middlesex in the 2017 County Championship on 6 August 2017.

In April 2022, he was bought by the Oval Invincibles for the 2022 season of The Hundred.

References

External links
 

1992 births
Living people
Australian cricketers
Middlesex cricketers
English cricketers
Australian emigrants to the United Kingdom
Oval Invincibles cricketers